The 2016–17 Southern Utah Thunderbirds basketball team represented Southern Utah University during the 2016–17 NCAA Division I men's basketball season. The Thunderbirds were led by first-year head coach Todd Simon and played their home games at the Centrum Arena in Cedar City, Utah as members of the Big Sky Conference. They finished the season 6–27, 3–15 in Big Sky play to finish in a tie for 11th. As the No. 11 seed in the Big Sky tournament, they defeated Montana State in the first round before losing to Weber State in the quarterfinals.

Previous season
The Thunderbirds finished the season 5–24, 3–15 in Big Sky play to finish in a tie for 11th place. They lost in the first round of the Big Sky tournament to North Dakota. On March 9, 2016, head coach Nick Robinson was fired. On March 22, the school hired Todd Simon as head coach.

Departures

Incoming Transfers

2016 incoming recruits

Roster

Schedule and results

|-
! colspan="9" style=| Exhibition

|-
! colspan="9" style=| Non-conference regular season

|-
! colspan="9" style=| Big Sky regular season

|-
! colspan="9" style=| Big Sky tournament

References

2016-17 team
2016–17 Big Sky Conference men's basketball season
2016 in sports in Utah
2017 in sports in Utah